Glen Edward Rogers (born July 15, 1962), also known as "The Cross Country Killer" or "The Casanova Killer", is an American serial killer. He was convicted of two murders and is a suspect in numerous others throughout the United States. He is considered a possible alternative suspect to O.J. Simpson in the 1994 murders of Nicole Brown Simpson and Ron Goldman, although as of 2022 none of these other allegations have led to formal charges. Rogers was featured on the FBI Ten Most Wanted Fugitives list after a crime spree that began on September 28, 1995, with Rogers' first authoritatively established murder.

Early life 
Rogers was born and raised in Hamilton, Ohio. He was one of seven children born to Edna (née Sears) and Claude Rogers. Claude was a hydro pulp operator at the local Champion paper company. Rogers was expelled from his junior high school before he was 16. Sometime after his expulsion, his 14-year-old girlfriend Deborah Ann Nix got pregnant by another man. The young couple married and had another child in 1981. In 1983, Nix filed for divorce, alleging physical abuse.

Murders 
Authorities suspected Rogers of stabbing or strangling an elderly man from Ohio in 1993 and four women in California, Mississippi, Florida, and Louisiana. He originally claimed the number of murders was closer to 70 but then recanted his statement, claiming he was joking and had not committed any murders.
 Mark Peters (Hamilton, Ohio) – suspected victim
 On January 10, 1994, police recovered the remains of 71-year-old Mark Peters, a retired electrician, and veteran, in a cabin belonging to the family of Glen Rogers in Beattyville, Kentucky. Peters had taken Glen Rogers in and allowed him to live in his home before October 1993, when Mark Peters was reported missing along with his car and several valuable personal items, including antiques, guns, and a collection of coins. Rogers had also disappeared, and reportedly his brother Clay led police to search the family cabin for clues, leading to the discovery of Peters' skeleton, which was found bound to a chair and covered by a pile of furniture.
 Sandra Gallagher (Los Angeles, California)
 On September 28, 1995, Sandra Gallagher, a 33-year-old mother of three, crossed paths with Rogers at McRed's bar in Van Nuys, California. The next day, Gallagher's strangled, badly burned corpse was found in her car near Rogers' Van Nuys apartment. Authorities allege that after murdering Gallagher, Rogers moved to Mississippi, Louisiana, and Florida, killing a woman in each state. On June 22, 1999, Rogers was convicted of murdering Gallagher, and on July 16, 1999, California sentenced him to death.
 Linda Price (Jackson, Mississippi)
 Kathy Carroll, Price's sister, said Price had met Rogers at a beer tent at the Mississippi State Fair. Her sister repeatedly said: "Ain't he good-looking?" Rogers and Price briefly shared an apartment in Jackson, Mississippi. The last time Carroll saw her sister was the night before Halloween 1995 when the two planned to have Carroll's grandchildren go trick-or-treating at Price's apartment. However, Price did not answer her door the next day, and Rogers was gone. Similar to the other killings, Price and Rogers met over drinks; like the other women, Price was in her 30s and had red hair. She was found dead in a bathtub.
 Tina Marie Cribbs (Tampa, Florida)
 On November 5, 1995, Cribbs was seen leaving the Showtown Bar in Gibsonton, Florida with Rogers. A bartender told police that Rogers had bought Cribbs and her friends' drinks and that Rogers later asked Cribbs for a ride. Two days later, a member of the cleaning staff at the Tampa 8 Inn discovered Cribbs' body in a bathtub, like Price in Mississippi; she had been stabbed in the chest and the buttocks. A clerk at the motel told authorities that Rogers had arrived at the motel a few days before the murder. On November 5, Rogers paid for an extra night and asked that his room not be cleaned. The clerk saw Rogers putting his belongings into a white Ford Festiva. The next day, Cribbs' wallet was discovered at a rest area in North Florida; the fingerprints lifted from her wallet and the motel room matched Rogers's fingerprints. On November 13, Rogers was arrested in Kentucky driving Cribbs' car, which he claimed had been lent to him. He also said Cribbs was alive when he left. On July 11, 1997, Rogers was convicted and sentenced to death for the murder of Tina Marie Cribbs.
 Andy Jiles Sutton (Bossier City, Louisiana)
 Sutton was a known acquaintance of Rogers. Her slashed body was found on November 9, 1995, on a punctured waterbed in her apartment in Bossier City, Louisiana.

Arrest, sentence, and appeals 
Rogers was arrested in Waco, Kentucky after a 13-mile (20 km) chase on November 13, 1995. Kentucky State Police Detective Bob Stephens noticed Cribbs's stolen car. He chased him, followed by rookie Irvine, Kentucky police officer Charles Cox. In contrast, trooper Ed Robinson and other officers set up a roadblock to stop Rogers. Robinson fired a shotgun blast that hit the rear tires but didn't stop Rogers, then Robinson joined the pursuit. Sgt. Joey Barnes (who formerly served with Florida Highway Patrol) rammed his patrol car into Cribbs's stolen car and spun him off the highway into a ditch. Stephens, Cox, Robinson, Barnes, and other officers surrounded Rogers and arrested him. A local TV news crew filmed Rogers's chase and arrest on the scene.

Rogers was scheduled to be executed on Valentine's Day 1999 in Florida. Still, he immediately appealed to the Florida Supreme Court, claiming that the State had not presented enough evidence to support the charges. Rogers also argued that the trial court should have granted the defense's motions for a mistrial because a witness was allowed to testify about a misdemeanor for which Rogers was convicted in California. He also claimed the prosecution was allowed to present an improper argument during closing arguments.

His appeal was delayed until March 2001 and was ultimately denied. In April 2005, Rogers filed another appeal; it was denied in 2011. It was his last appeal.

Television and film 
The 2012 documentary My Brother the Serial Killer examined Rogers' crimes and included claims that Rogers killed Nicole Brown Simpson and Ron Goldman in 1994. According to Rogers' brother Clay, Rogers claimed that, before the murders, he had met Brown and was "going to take her down."

During a lengthy correspondence that began in 2009 between Rogers and criminal profiler Anthony Meolis, Rogers wrote and created paintings about his involvement with the murders. During a prison meeting between the two, Rogers claimed O.J. Simpson hired him to break into Nicole Brown Simpson's house and steal some expensive jewelry and that Simpson had told him, "You may have to kill the bitch". In a filmed interview, Glen's brother Clay asserts that his brother confessed his involvement.

Rogers' family stated that he had informed them that he had been working for Nicole in 1994 and that he had made verbal threats about her to them. Rogers later spoke to a criminal profiler about the Goldman-Simpson murders, providing details about the crime and remarking that he had been hired by O.J. Simpson to steal a pair of earrings and potentially murder Nicole.

Rogers was the subject of an episode of The FBI Files titled "Deadly Stranger" (Season 3, Episode 12). He was also the subject of an episode of Southern Fried Homicide titled "Smooth Talking Devil" (Season 3, Episode 2) on Investigation Discovery.

The Oxygen channel's series It Takes a Killer episode "The Casanova Killer", (run time: 22 minutes, air date: September 2, 2016) focuses on four of the murders linked to Rogers and the manhunt leading to his capture.

The 2019 film The Murder of Nicole Brown Simpson purports to tell the story as asserted by Rogers and his family about his involvement with Nicole Brown Simpson. Rogers is portrayed by Nick Stahl, and Mena Suvari portrays Nicole Brown Simpson.

See also 
 List of death row inmates in the United States
 List of serial killers in the United States

Bibliography 
 Combs, Stephen M; Eckberg, J. Road Dog. Federal Point Pub Inc, 2002 
 Linedecker, Clifford L. Smooth Operator: The True Story of Seductive Serial Killer Glen Rogers. St. Martin's True Crime Classics, 1997 
 Spizer, J. The Cross Country Killer. Top Publications, Ltd., 2001

References 

1962 births
1993 murders in the United States
1994 murders in the United States
1995 murders in the United States
20th-century American criminals
American male criminals
American people convicted of murder
American prisoners sentenced to death
American rapists
American serial killers
Criminals from Ohio
Living people
Male serial killers
People from Hamilton, Ohio
Prisoners sentenced to death by Florida